was a Japanese international school in Milton Keynes, Buckinghamshire, England. The school, a Catholic institution, was one of several Japanese private schools in the UK with a Japanese curriculum. This school was an overseas branch of a Japanese private school, or a Shiritsu zaigai kyōiku shisetsu (私立在外教育施設).

The former Gyosei campus is located at Willen Park. It included a baseball diamond, dormitories, and sports facilities. The facility was a boarding school.<ref>Milton Keynes Development Corporation. The Milton Keynes planning manual'. Chesterton Consulting on behalf of Milton Keynes Development Corporation, 1992. p. 105. "There is also the Gyosei School in Willen Park, a boarding school for Japanese children."</ref>

History
The school opened in Milton Keynes in 1987. Father  (田川 茂 Tagawa Shigeru), the principal of the Gyosei International School, was the founding principal of this school. He opened the school to serve Japanese children in the European Community (EC) who were members of diplomatic families and families on business. The construction company Higgs and Hill won the contract to design and build the school in association with the Mitsui Construction Company. Mitsui Construction was the main contracting company, while Higgs and Hill designed the school. The design and construct programme had a cost of £8 million.

In 1991 the school was Europe's largest Japanese school, with 1,000 students.

As of 1995 the school had 700 students from elementary through after junior high school. In 1998 the school had 9.8 points in its GCSE rankings.

Around 1998 there was an incident where a group of students placed barricades in their dormitory area and loudly made statements against teachers; Lesley Downer The Independent'' stated that reports cited the students not being permitted to participate in the local football culture nor visiting the McDonald's in town.

The secondary school's peak number of students was 400. In January 2002 it had 30 students, and that month the school announced it would close in March of that year, stating that the economic crisis in Japan was responsible for its closing. By 2002 fewer Japanese executives were being sent abroad and fewer Japanese families sent their children abroad to study. Shiro Suematsu was the school's final chief administrator. The school closed on 8 May 2002.

In 2004 a developer planned to demolish the school campus and replace it with a housing development. The site is now a retirement village.

See also

 Gyosei International College in the UK (defunct Japanese post-secondary college later renamed to Witan Hall)
 Gyosei International School (international school in Japan)
 Japanese community in the United Kingdom
 Japanese students in the United Kingdom
 Japan–United Kingdom relations

British international schools in Japan:
 The British School in Tokyo

References

External links
  "提携大学および姉妹校概要." (Archive) Gyosei International College in the UK – Has section discussing the Gyosei International School UK

Further reading
 "REDEVELOPMENT OF SCHOOL FOR RESIDENTIAL DEVELOPMENT INCLUDING COMMUNITY VILLAGE COMPRISING 250 UNITS AND ASSOCIATED FACILITIES (OUTLINE) – REQUEST TO VARY THE TERMS OF THE EXISTING SECTION 106 AGREEMENT AT Gyosei International School, Brickhill Street, Willen Park."
 "Redundant School site released and fully developed, overcoming strong local opposition." ExtraCare Charitable Trust. 
 "MINUTES OF THE FIFTH MEETING OF THE MILTON KEYNES PARTNERSHIP COMMITTEE MONDAY 20 JUNE 2005 HELD AT 2.00 PM AT THE COUNCIL CHAMBER,MILTON KEYNES COUNCIL OFFICES." p. 5/6 "MKP 68/05 GYOSEI, CANALSIDE SITE – DISPOSAL FOR RESIDENTIAL USE "

Boarding schools in Buckinghamshire
1987 establishments in England
Educational institutions disestablished in 1987
2002 disestablishments in England
Educational institutions disestablished in 2002
Japanese international schools in the United Kingdom
Defunct schools in Milton Keynes
Defunct boarding schools in England
Defunct shiritsu zaigai kyōiku shisetsu in Europe